The Digboi Refinery was set up at Digboi in 1901 by Assam Oil Company Ltd. The Indian Oil Corporation Ltd (IOC) took over the refinery and marketing management of Assam Oil Company Ltd. with effect from 1981 and created a separate division. This division has both refinery and marketing operations.  The refinery at Digboi had an installed capacity 0.50 million tonnes per year. The refining capacity of the refinery was increased to 0.65 million tonnes per year by modernization of refinery in July, 1996.  A new delayed Coking Unit of 170,000 tonnes per year capacity was commissioned in 1999.  A new Solvent Dewaxing Unit for maximizing production of microcrystalline wax was installed and commissioned in 2003.  The refinery has also installed Hydrotreater-UOP in 2002 to improve the quality of diesel. The MSQ Upgradation unit has been commissioned. A new terminal was expected to be completed by 2016.

History 
Digboi refinery is known as birthplace of the oil Industry in India. It was  commissioned on 11 December 1901. It has the distinction of being Asia's first refinery and one of oldest still in operation. Oil was accidentally discovered in 1867 while laying a railway line in Digboi area. It was just found seeping out in dense jungles in Tinsukia district. Digging for oil was started in 1889 and the refinery set up in 1901 at Digboi.

See also 

 Bongaigaon Refinery
 Guwahati Refinery

References

External links
Digboi Refinery - Our Second Century
Article on Discover Far East

Energy in Assam
Oil refineries in India
Tinsukia
Companies based in Assam
Indian Oil Corporation buildings and structures
1901 establishments in India